Puebla del Maestre is a municipality in the province of Badajoz, Extremadura, Spain. It has a population of 831 and an area of 79 km².

References

Municipalities in the Province of Badajoz